Tanveer Sangha (born 26 November 2001) is an Australian cricketer who plays for Sydney Thunder in the Big Bash League (BBL). He bowls right arm leg spin and bats right-handed. He was Australia’s leading wicket taker at the 2020 Under-19 Cricket World Cup, claiming 15 wickets.

Personal life
Tanveer's father, Joga Sangha, hails from Rahimpur, a village near Jalandhar in India. Joga moved to Australia in 1997 for education before eventually settling down in the southwestern suburbs of Sydney. Tanveer's father works as a Taxi driver in Sydney, while his mother, Upneet, works as an accountant in Sydney.

Cricket career
He made his Twenty20 debut on 12 December 2020, for the Sydney Thunder, in the 2020–21 Big Bash League. In January 2021, Sangha was named in Australia's Twenty20 International (T20I) squad for their series against New Zealand. He made his first-class debut on 27 October 2021, for New South Wales in the 2021–22 Sheffield Shield season. He made his List A debut on 24 November 2021, for New South Wales in the 2021–22 Marsh One-Day Cup. In August 2022 he was signed by Birmingham Phoenix to play in The Hundred.

References

External links
 

Living people
2001 births
Australian cricketers
New South Wales cricketers
Sydney Thunder cricketers
Australian sportspeople of Indian descent
Birmingham Phoenix cricketers